Staller Saddle, at , is a high mountain pass in the High Tauern range of the Central Eastern Alps, connecting the Defereggen Valley in East Tyrol with the Antholz Valley in South Tyrol. The pass forms the border between Austria and Italy, it separates the Villgraten Mountains in the southeast from the Rieserferner Group in the northwest.

The pass road is open only from May to October from 5:30 am to 22:15 and prohibited for trailers and caravans. On the Italian side it is very narrow, at points only one way, with traffic lights regulating the contraflow. Starting in 2007, a toll of 5 euros was planned for cars and motorcycles, the revenue to be split between Italy and Austria, but has not yet been implemented.

Gallery

See also
 List of highest paved roads in Europe
 List of mountain passes

External links 

Mountain passes of the Alps
Mountain passes of Tyrol (state)
Mountain passes of South Tyrol
Austria–Italy border crossings
Villgraten Mountains